Doctor Ivan Mikhaylovich Sechenov (Tyoply Stan (now Sechenovo) near Simbirsk, Russia – , Moscow), was a Russian psychologist, physiologist, and medical scientist. 

The very famous Russian scientist of human reflexes Pavlov referred to him as the "Father of Russian physiology and scientific psychology" at his time, but today we rather consider Sechenov as scientist in medical physiology, and father of Russian physiology and also researcher in psychology, but also in relation to it in neurological physiology. Sechenov is also considered one of the originators of objective psychology  as an attempt to introduce objectiveness in the rather wide Russian psychology field and the many developments in it.

Biography
Sechenov was born in the village of Tepli Stan, which is now known as Sechenov, Gorky Oblast. He was a son of a nobleman and a peasant. Sechenov was first taught by private tutors and he had mastered German and French at an early age. By the age of 14, he was admitted to the St. Petersburg Military Engineering School. After his military training, he became interested with medicine so he studied medicine at Moscow University, completing an M.D. degree in 1856. He received the best of Russian education both in basic and clinical sciences. He then pursued higher medical education abroad and was mentored and influenced by European scientists that included Johannes Müller, Emil DuBois-Reymond, Hermann von Helmholtz, Carl F. W. Ludwig, Robert W. Bunsen, and Heinrich Magnus. Sechenov worked as a professor at the Medical Surgery Academy until 1870.

1843-1848 Main Military Engineering School, now Military engineering-technical university (Russian: Военный инженерно-технический университет), in Saint Petersburg
1850-1856 studies of medicine at Moscow University
1860 M.D. from the Imperial Military Medical Academy of St. Petersburg
1860-1870 professor at the Imperial Military Medical Academy. Foundation of the first Russian school of physiology. Sechenov resigned to protest the rejection of Ilya Ilyich Mechnikov (the founder of immunology, the Nobel Prize laureate of 1908)
1870 chemical research in Mendeleev's laboratory in St. Petersburg
1871-1876 chair at the Novorossiysk University at Odessa (where Mechnikov had been appointed Titular Professor of Zoology and Comparative Anatomy)
1876-1888 professor at St. Petersburg University
1889 "Sechenov's equation" is introduced (from experimental evidence) for solubility of gases
1891-1901 professor at Moscow University
1904 elected honorary member of Russian Academy of Sciences

Sechenov's major interest was neurophysiology (the structure of the brain). He showed that brain activity is linked to electric currents and developed an interest in electrophysiology. Among his discoveries was the cerebral inhibition of spinal reflexes. He also maintained that chemical factors in the environment of the cell are of great importance.

From 1856–1862 Sechenov studied and worked in Europe in laboratories of Mueller, du Bois-Reymond, von Helmholtz (Berlin), Felix Hoppe-Seyler (Leipzig), Ludwig (Vienna), and Claude Bernard (Paris).

Like several other Russian scientists of the period Sechenov was often in conflict with the tsarist government and conservative colleagues, but he did not emigrate. In 1866, the censorship committee in St. Petersburg attempted judicial procedures accusing Sechenov of spreading materialism and of "debasing of Christian morality".

Impact
Sechenov's work laid the foundations for the study of physiology, reflexes, neurology, animal and human behaviour, and neuroscience. He also was noticed by Russian psychologists for his essays in psychology and the need of objectivist approach. Sechenov influenced Pavlov, many Russian physiologists and Vladimir Nikolayevich Myasishchev, when the Institute of Brain and Psychic Activity was set up in 1918.

For some he was influential to Bekhterev but this may be argued as many schools in psychology and physiology date Bekhterev as a Russian scientist much earlier than Pavlov and Sechenov.

Sechenov also authored the Russian classic, Reflexes of the Brain, which introduced electrophysiology to neurophysiology at laboratories and in medical education.

Trivia
According to a study conducted in 2015, Sechenov was included in "Russia team on medicine". This list includes fifty-three famous Russian medical scientists from the Russian Federation, the Soviet Union, and the Russian Empire who were born in 1757—1950. Physicians of all specialities listed here. Among them Vladimir Bekhterev, Vladimir Demikhov, Sergei Korsakoff, Ivan Pavlov, Nikolay Pirogov, Victor Skumin.

Selected works
1860 "Materials on future of physiology", Материалы для будущей физиологии.. St. Petersburg (Part I "Some facts for the future study of alcohol intoxication", in Russian)
1862 "On animal electricity", О животном Электричестве. St. Petersburg (in Russian)
1863 "Reflexions of the brain", Рефлексы головного мозга. Medical newspaper, Медицинский вестник 47-48 ("Reflexes of the brain", in Russian)
1866 "Physiology of the nervous system", Физиология нервной системы. St. Petersburg (in Russian)
1873 "Who should and How to develop Psychology", "Кому и как разрабатывать психологию?." Vestnik Evropy 4 (in Russian)
1897 The Physiological Criteria of the Length of the Working Day
1900 Participation of the Nervous System in Man's Working Movements
1901 Participation of the Senses and Manual dexterity in Sighted and Blind Persons
1901 Essay on Man's Working Movements

Commemoration
1954 the area around Sechenov's birthplace was renamed Sechenovsky District of Nizhny Novgorod Oblast
1955 Moscow Medical Academy was given name of I.M.Sechenov; its campus includes memorial of Sechenov
1956 Institute of Evolutionary Physiology in Leningrad was reorganized as a part of USSR Academy of Sciences and named after I.M.Sechenov

References

 Zusne, Leonard. 1984. Biographical Dictionary of Psychology. Westport, Connecticut: Greenwood Press. 
 Ivan Sechenov at University of Illinois at Chicago, Department of Neurology
 Ivan Sechenov at Max Planck Institute for History - part of "The Virtual Laboratory, Essays and Resources on the Experimentalization of Life"

Russian physiologists
1829 births
1905 deaths
Military Engineering-Technical University alumni
Corresponding members of the Saint Petersburg Academy of Sciences
Honorary members of the Saint Petersburg Academy of Sciences
Determinists
Burials at Novodevichy Cemetery
20th-century Russian scientists
19th-century scientists from the Russian Empire